Lam Hin Chung (born 4 November 1986, Hong Kong) is a Hong Kong fencer. At the 2012 Summer Olympics, he competed in the Men's sabre, but was defeated in the first round.

References

Hong Kong male sabre fencers
Living people
1986 births
Fencers at the 2012 Summer Olympics
Olympic fencers of Hong Kong
Fencers at the 2006 Asian Games
Fencers at the 2010 Asian Games
Fencers at the 2014 Asian Games
Fencers at the 2018 Asian Games
Asian Games bronze medalists for Hong Kong
Asian Games medalists in fencing
Medalists at the 2014 Asian Games
Medalists at the 2018 Asian Games